"Alice"  is a song by the British rock band the Sisters of Mercy, written by vocalist Andrew Eldritch. The song was released as a non-album single by the band's own label by Merciful Release, on 21 November 1982. It was re-released in March 1983 as a 12" EP.

Recording
After one week of pre-production at Andrew Eldritch's flat in Leeds, four tracks were recorded over two weekends with producer John Ashton of the Psychedelic Furs at Kenny Giles's studio in Bridlington: "Alice", "Floorshow", Stooges cover "1969" and the unreleased "Good Things".

The same four songs had been previously recorded for a BBC radio session in August 1982.

"Alice" and "Floorshow" were released as the band's third 7" single on 21 November 1982.

Alice (EP)

With two additional tracks, "1969" and the new recording "Phantom", the 12" EP Alice was released in March 1983.

Ashton financed a US release (the band's first) of the 12" EP on Island Park, New York label Brain Eater Records.

The EP was never released as a stand-alone CD, but was included on the Some Girls Wander by Mistake collection.

Track listing
7" single (1982)12" EP (1983)

Personnel
Andrew Eldritch – vocals
Craig Adams – bass guitar
Ben Gunn – guitar
Gary Marx – guitar
Doktor Avalanche (drum machine) – drums

Artist commentary
Andrew Eldritch (1990): “My attitude to 'Alice' has changed over the years. I wrote it in ten minutes about pills and tranks when I used to care about watching people I know get dragged down by that. Now I really don't care.”
Gary Marx (1983/2003): “Ben joined us last year. The first single that we did with him was 'Alice', which was like our break in a very small way, as it got us into the indie charts [...] The Psychedelic Furs put up all the costs so it was no skin off our noses. What happened was, Andy went to see the Furs a long time ago and gave them our first tape, which they liked and gave to various people, including their manager. So we've had a lot of help and advice from them. John Ashton, the Furs' guitarist, produced 'Alice' which was the reason why it was so good. With a bit of luck he might help us with the next one.” “The guitar sound was my old £85 Shergold in the early days, something I’d borrowed off Jon Langford or other friends of the family, or one of Andrew’s guitars [...] We’d made ‘Alice’ with John Ashton producing who did a brilliant job, and rather than invite him to work with us again Andrew believed he’d learnt everything he could from John and took sole responsibility for [the band's follow-up single] ‘Anaconda’.”''
Les Mills (manager, 2004): “I arranged for them to record with John as I felt it would benefit both parties, as the Sisters' previous recorded work had been dire and John wanted to get into production.”

References

1982 songs
1982 singles
The Sisters of Mercy songs